Leslie "Les" Graham (14 May 1924 – 1998) was an English professional footballer and manager.

An inside-forward, Graham began his career at  Blackburn Rovers where he made 150 Football League appearances. He joined Newport County in 1952 and made 96 appearances, scoring 39 goals. Graham joined Watford in 1955 but later returned to Newport in 1957 making a further 64 appearances, scoring 15 goals. In 1959 he joined Cambridge City.

In 1967, he was appointed manager of Newport County and he retained the position until 1969.

References

External links
 

English footballers
English football managers
Blackburn Rovers F.C. players
Newport County A.F.C. players
Watford F.C. players
English Football League players
1924 births
1998 deaths
Date of death missing
Newport County A.F.C. managers
Association football inside forwards
Cambridge City F.C. players